This article shows all participating team squads at the Volleyball at the 2016 Summer Olympics – Women's European qualification, held in Turkey from January 4 to January 9, 2016.

Head Coach: Gert Vande Broek

Head Coach: Miroslav Aksentijević

Head Coach: Felix Koslowski

Head Coach: Marco Bonitta

Head Coach: Jacek Nawrocki

Head Coach: Yuri Marichev

Head Coach: Giovanni Guidetti

Head Coach: Ferhat Akbaş

See also
 Volleyball at the 2016 Summer Olympics – Men's European qualification squads

External links
Official website
Process

2016 in volleyball
Volleyball qualification for the 2016 Summer Olympics
Olympic women's volleyball squads
2016 in women's volleyball
Vol